Phlebotomy is the process of making a puncture in a vein, usually in the arm, with a cannula for the purpose of drawing blood. The procedure itself is known as a venipuncture, which is also used for intravenous therapy. A person who performs a phlebotomy is called a phlebotomist, although most doctors, nurses, and other technicians can also carry out a phlebotomy. In contrast, phlebectomy is the removal of a vein.

Phlebotomies that are carried out in the treatment of some blood disorders are known as therapeutic phlebotomies. The average volume of whole blood drawn in a therapeutic phlebotomy to an adult is 1 unit (450-500 ml) weekly to once every several months, as needed.

Etymology
From  ( –  'blood vessel, vein' +  'cutting'), via  (modern French ).

Phlebotomies
Phlebotomies are carried out by phlebotomists – people trained to draw blood mostly from veins for clinical or medical testing, transfusions, donations, or research. Blood is collected primarily by performing venipunctures, or by using capillary blood sampling with fingersticks or a heel stick in infants for the collection of minute quantities of blood. The duties of a phlebotomist may include interpreting the tests requested, drawing blood into the correct tubes with the proper additives, accurately explaining the procedure to the person and preparing them accordingly, practicing the required forms of asepsis, practicing standard and universal precautions, restoring hemostasis of the puncture site, giving instructions on post-puncture care, affixing tubes with electronically printed labels, and delivering specimens to a laboratory. Some countries, states, or districts require that phlebotomists be licensed or registered.

A therapeutic phlebotomy may be carried out in the treatment of some blood disorders (example: Hemochromatosis, polycythemia vera, porphyria cutanea tarda), and chronic hives (in research).

Australia
In Australia, there are a number of courses in phlebotomy offered by educational institutions, but training is typically provided on the job. The minimum primary qualification for phlebotomists in Australia is a Certificate III in Pathology Collection (HLT37215) from an approved educational institution.

United Kingdom
In the UK there is no requirement for holding a formal qualification or certification prior to becoming a phlebotomist as training is usually provided on the job. The NHS offers training with formal certification upon completion.

United States
Special state certification in the United States is required only in four states: California, Washington, Nevada, and Louisiana. A phlebotomist can become nationally certified through many different organizations. However, California currently only accepts national certificates from six agencies. These include the American Certification Agency (ACA), American Medical Technologists (AMT), American Society for Clinical Pathology (ASCP), National Center for Competency Testing/Multi-skilled Medical Certification Institute (NCCT/MMCI), National Credentialing Agency (NCA), National Healthcareer Association (NHA), and the National Phlebotomy Certification Examination (NPCE). These and other agencies also certify phlebotomists outside the state of California. To qualify to sit for an examination, candidates must complete a full phlebotomy course and provide documentation of clinical or laboratory experience.

South Africa
In South Africa learnerships to qualify as a Phlebotomy Technician are offered by many public and private educational institutions as well as by private academies owned up by pathology laboratories (such as Ampath Laboratories, Lancet, PathCare) and healthcare service providers (such as Netcare, South African National Blood Service). Some of the larger retail pharmacy chains offering in-store clinical services (such as Clicks, Dis-Chem) also provide training for aspirant phlebotomists. Certification can be obtained from a number of examination and testing institutions. To work as a phlebotomist in South Africa, registration with the Health Professions Council of South Africa (HPCSA) is required.

Sample-tube-types

History

Early "phlebotomists" used techniques such as leeches and incision to extract blood from the body. Bloodletting was used as a therapeutic as well as a prophylactic process, thought to remove toxins from the body and to balance the humors. While physicians did perform bloodletting, it was a specialty of barber surgeons, the primary provider of health care to most people in the medieval and early modern eras.

See also
 Cytotechnologist
 Injection (medicine)
 Medical technologist
 List of surgeries by type
 Phlebotominae

References

Vascular surgery
Blood tests